
Gmina Olkusz is an urban-rural gmina (administrative district) in Olkusz County, Lesser Poland Voivodeship, in southern Poland.

The gmina contains part of the protected area called Kraków Valleys Landscape Park.

Villages
Apart from the town of Olkusz, Gmina Olkusz contains the villages and settlements of Bogucin Mały, Braciejówka, Gorenice, Kogutek Kosmołowski, Kosmolów, Niesułowice, Olewin, Osiek, Pazurek, Podlesie, Rabsztyn, Sieniczno, Troks, Wiśliczka, Witeradów, Zawada, Zederman, Zimnodół and Żurada.

Neighbouring gminas
Gmina Olkusz is bordered by the town of Bukowno and by the gminas of Bolesław, Jerzmanowice-Przeginia, Klucze, Krzeszowice, Sułoszowa, Trzebinia, Trzyciąż and Wolbrom.

References
Polish official population figures 2006

Olkusz
Olkusz County